Harold Gaba, also known as Hal Gaba (January 1946 – March 2009), was an American businessman. He served as president and chief executive officer at Act III Communications, chairman at Concord Records, and co-chairman at Village Roadshow Pictures.

Early life
Gaba was born January 22, 1946, in Oakland, California. He received a bachelor's degree in finance at the University of California, Berkeley, where he was a member of Pi Lambda Phi, and a master's degree in finance at the University of California, Los Angeles.

Career
Gaba's career began in 1967 with a position as a research analyst at William O'Neil & Co. His long-time association with Norman Lear started in 1974 when he joined Lear, Bud Yorkin, and Jerry Perenchio at Tandem Productions as an acquisitions consultant.

Gaba went on to serve as president at Embassy Pay Television and vice chairman at Hal Roach Studios.

In 1990, Gaba became president and CEO at Norman Lear's Act III Communications, a media holding company with interests in broadcasting, exhibition theater, publishing, motion pictures, and music.

In 1999, Lear and Gaba became co-owners of Concord Records, founded in 1973 as a jazz label in Concord, California. In 2006, Gaba and Lear, joined by their long-time colleague Michael Lambert, acquired a 50% interest in Village Roadshow Pictures.

Gaba was a member of the board of directors at World Trade Bank, Union Rescue Mission, Univision, the Henry Mancini Institute, and the Curtis School. He also was part of the executive committee at the Weizmann Institute of Science.

Personal life 
Gaba was married to Carole Gaba. They lived in the Bel Air neighborhood of Los Angeles and had two children, Lauren and Elizabeth.

Gaba died from prostate cancer on March 9, 2009, at the age of 63.

References

1946 births
Haas School of Business alumni
UCLA Anderson School of Management alumni
American entertainment industry businesspeople
2009 deaths